Diego Ifrán Sala  (born 8 June 1987) is an Uruguayan footballer who retired in 2016. He used to play as a forward.

Club career
Born in Cerro Chato, Ifrán began his career with Fénix, where he played between 2006 and 2008. In the 2008 summer he moved to local giants Danubio.

On 13 August 2010 Ifrán signed a five-year deal with Real Sociedad, despite being sidelined due to a severe knee injury. He made his debut on 7 March of the following year, coming on as a late substitute in a 1–2 loss at Deportivo de La Coruña. His first goal came on 3 April, but in a 1–3 home loss against Hércules CF.

On 8 July 2013 Ifrán suffered an anterior cruciate ligament injury, being sidelined until January of the following year. On 19 March 2014 he was loaned to Deportivo until June.

On 1 August 2014 Ifrán moved to fellow Segunda División side CD Tenerife, also in a temporary deal. On 2 July 2015, he joined Peñarol.

References

External links
Real Sociedad official profile 

1987 births
Living people
People from Cerro Chato
Uruguayan footballers
Association football forwards
Uruguayan Primera División players
La Liga players
Segunda División players
Peruvian Primera División players
Centro Atlético Fénix players
Danubio F.C. players
Peñarol players
Real Sociedad footballers
Deportivo de La Coruña players
CD Tenerife players
Sporting Cristal footballers
Uruguayan expatriate footballers
Expatriate footballers in Spain
Expatriate footballers in Peru